Piyanat Pohpar (born April 28, 1988) is a professional footballer from Thailand. He currently plays for Ayutthaya in the Thai Division 1 League.

Honours

Club
Ubon Ratchathani
 Thai Division 2 League Champions (1) : 2014

References

1988 births
Living people
Piyanat Pohpar
Piyanat Pohpar
Association football defenders
Piyanat Pohpar
Piyanat Pohpar
Piyanat Pohpar
Piyanat Pohpar